George J. Barnsby (–11 April 2010) was an English author and Socialist scholar.

Biography 
He was born and grew up in Battersea, Surrey. Following military service in India and Burma he studied at the London School of Economics where he obtained an economics degree enabling him to become a teacher. His interest in socialism dated back to his pre-war experiences and his convictions were strengthened by his military service.

In the late 1970s he took time off from teaching to study at University of Birmingham, producing two books, The Working Class Movement in the Black Country 1750–1867 (1977) and Social Conditions in the Black Country 1800–1900 (1980), which earned him an MA and a PhD.

He retired early due to heart problems and then wrote extensively on the history of Chartism, education, housing, the ideas of the Welsh social reformer Robert Owen, and the 1926 general strike in the Black Country. He also produced a major work in 1998, Socialism in Birmingham and the Black Country 1850–1939.

Bibliography 
 The Great Indian Famine, 1943–1944 (1973) (as George J. Barnsby) Working Class Library and Free Communist Bookshop ASIN B001PDWVZS
 The Working Class Movement in the Black Country 1750–1867 (1977) Integrated Publishing Services 
 Social Conditions in the Black Country 1800–1900 (1980) Integrated Publishing Services (April 
 Votes for Women – The Struggle For the Vote in the Black Country, 1900–1918 (1995) Socialist History Society, occasional pamphlet series 
 Socialism in Birmingham and the Black Country 1850–1939 (1998) Integrated Publishing Services 
 Subversive – or one third of the autobiography of a Communist (2002) George Barnsby Books 
 Combating Institutional Racism in Wolverhampton (2002)

References

External links 
 Official website
 Obituary: George Barnsby
 George Barnsby: Biography
 VOTES FOR WOMEN: The Struggle for the Vote in the Black Country 1900–1918
 Obituary and personal notes by Nasir Khan
 Express & Star article on the occasion of his 90th birthday

1910s births
2010 deaths
Alumni of the London School of Economics
Alumni of the University of Birmingham
Writers from Wolverhampton
People from Battersea
History of the West Midlands (county)
20th-century English historians
English communists
English male non-fiction writers